The International Boundaries Research Unit (IBRU) is a research centre at Durham University in the United Kingdom. It provides practical expertise in boundary-making, border management and territorial dispute resolution.

History
IBRU was established in 1989.  Its function involves the study of boundaries and their impact on international relations and borderland development.

Conferences
IBRU has organised international conferences to explore intellectual and practical questions relating to international boundaries and territorial dispute resolution.  These international gatherings have included:

  The State of Sovereignty (Durham, 2009)
  Land and River Boundary Demarcation and Maintenance in Support of Borderland Development (Bangkok, 2006)
  Border Management in an Insecure World (Durham, 2006)
 Borders, Orders and Identities in the Muslim World (Durham, 2000)
 Permeable Boundaries and Borders in a Globalising World (Vancouver, 1999)
 Borderlands Under Stress (Durham, 1998)
 Boundaries and Energy: Problems and Prospects (Durham, 1996)
 International Boundaries and Environmental Security (Singapore, 1995)
 The Peaceful Management of Transboundary Resources (Durham, 1994)
 Boundary and Territorial Issues in the Mediterranean Basin (Malta, 1992)
 International Boundaries: Fresh Perspectives (Durham, 1991)
 International Boundaries and Boundary Conflict Resolution (Durham, 1989)

Selected works
IBRU's published works encompass 51 works in 86 works in 114 publications in 2 languages and 1,325 library holdings.

 The Middle East and North Africa (1994)
 Territorial proposals for the settlement of the war in Bosnia-Hercegovina (1994) by Mladen Klemenčić
 The encyclopedia of international boundaries (1995)
 The territorial dispute between Indonesia and Malaysia over Pulau Sipadan and Pulau Ligitan in the Celebes Sea: a study in international law (1995) by R Haller-Trost
 Positioning and mapping international land boundaries (1995) by Ron K Adler
 How to prove title to territory : a brief, practical introduction to the law and evidence (1998) by John McHugo
 The international boundaries of East Timor (2001) by Neil Deeley

Notes

External links
 IBRU web site
 Dzurek, Daniel J.  "The Senkaku/Diaoyu Islands Dispute," October 18, 1996.

Durham University
Educational institutions established in 1989
1989 establishments in the United Kingdom
Research institutes in the United Kingdom